A list of current and former county roads in Simcoe County, Ontario, Canada.

Current county roads 
The table below lists all currently existing county roads in commission.

Former county roads 
The following table list county roads that once existed, but were decommissioned, and transferred to local municipalities.

References

 
Simcoe